Assyriska is a reference to various Swedish football clubs. 

Assyriska Föreningen
Assyriska FF Babylon
Assyriska KIF N.botkyrk
Assyriska Hamorabi IF
Assur Föreningen